Bridge No. 455 is a historic open spandrel concrete bridge, carrying Connecticut Route 159 across Stony Brook in southern Suffield, Connecticut.  Completed in 1929, it is one of six surviving open spandrel concrete bridges in the state.  It was listed on the National Register of Historic Places in 2004.

Description and history
Bridge No. 455 is located in southeastern Suffield, carrying Connecticut Route 159 across Stony Brook. Route 159 is the major north-south route through eastern Suffield, running roughly parallel to the Connecticut River. The bridge is set across a steep and rocky ravine. The roadway is two lanes wide.

The bridge was completed in 1929 as part of a major initiative by the state Department of Transportation to improve the infrastructure of its main highways.  At the time Route 159 was the principal north-south route between Hartford and Springfield, Massachusetts, and is still a major secondary road, having been supplanted by Interstate 91 for most traffic.  The state used open spandrel structures over ravines and for exceptionally long spans, where significant cost savings were achieved by reducing materials costs.  The state also declared a preference for the bridges for their aesthetics, and used them with some frequency.  There are now only six such bridges left in the state.

See also
National Register of Historic Places listings in Hartford County, Connecticut
List of bridges on the National Register of Historic Places in Connecticut

References

Bridges on the National Register of Historic Places in Connecticut
National Register of Historic Places in Hartford County, Connecticut
Bridges completed in 1929
Bridges in Hartford County, Connecticut
Suffield, Connecticut
Concrete bridges in the United States
Open-spandrel deck arch bridges in the United States
Road bridges in Connecticut